The 2019 BWF Para-Badminton World Championships was held from 20 to 25 August 2019 in Basel, Switzerland.

Host city selection
After Basel was selected to be the host of 2019 BWF World Championships in March 2019, the organizing team proposed to hold the able-bodied badminton world championships together the para-badminton world championships. The proposal was approved by Badminton World Federation thus marking the first time Para-Badminton World Championships is held together with World Badminton Championships in the same venue.

Participating countries
313 players from 49 countries took part.

 (5)
 (1)
 (1)
 (13)
 (10)
 (20)
 (4)
 (1)
 (1)
 (1)
 (1)
 (8)
 (12)
 (1)
 (7)
 (19)
 (10)
 (1)
 (3)
 (26)
 (9)
 (3)
 (2)
 (4)
 (25)
 (8)
 (6)
 (4)
 (1)
 (7)
 (1)
 (3)
 (7)
 (2)
 (16)
 (4)
 (1)
 (1)
 (10)
 (4)
 (1)
 (5) Host country
 (16)
 (7)
 (4)
 (5)
 (9)
 (4)
 (1)

Medalists

Men's events

Women's events

Mixed events

Medal table

See also
2019 BWF World Championships

References

BWF Para-Badminton World Championships
Para-Badminton World Championships
Para-Badminton BWF World Championships
International sports competitions hosted by Switzerland